The 1997 PBA Governors Cup Finals was the best-of-7 basketball championship series of the 1997 PBA Governors Cup, and the conclusion of the conference's playoffs. The Alaska Milkmen and Purefoods Carne Norte Beefies played for the 68th championship contested by the league.

The Alaska Milkmen won against Purefoods Carne Norte Beefies, 4 games to 1, to retain the Governor's Cup title for the 4th straight time.

Johnny Abarrientos won on his second back to back PBA Finals MVP in Governors Cup Finals.

Qualification

Series scoring summary

Games summary

Game 1

The Beefies ripped the game wide open with a 16–9 burst to take a commanding 53–41 spread. The Milkmen were able to bring down the lead to just four, 55–59. Import Mike Jones came back at the start of the fourth as the Beefies coasted to a 74–64 lead.

Game 2

The Milkmen kept their composure with every Beefies rally, Johnny Abarrientos had two key baskets in an 8–3 run that finally quelled another Beefies offensive.

Game 3

The Beefies took a 64–61 advantage on an 18–6 run, but the Milkmen, behind Kenneth Duremdes and Sean Chambers took matters into their own hands in the remainder of the third period, giving Alaska a 73–65 lead going into the final quarter. The Beefies could not get closer than seven points at 84–91, entering the last two minutes.

Game 4

Game 5

Alaska jumped to a 27–10 lead at the end of the first quarter. The Beefies played minus injured import Mike Jones and they could not sink a decent number of shots from the field, a 14–0 start by the Milkmen in the second period gave them a 31-point spread, 41–10, as Alaska positioned itself to an early victory party in the first half against a demoralized Beefies Then Johnny Abarrientos on his back to back second Finals MVP and Alaska captures a back to back 2 peat champs seventh title.

Rosters

Broadcast notes

References

External links
PBA official website

1997 PBA season
1997
Alaska Aces (PBA) games
Magnolia Hotshots games
PBA Governors' Cup Finals